ASAP Inc., stylized Asap, is an American online and mobile prepared food ordering and delivery and Grocery delivery company. It originated in Lake Charles, Louisiana, where it was founded as Waitr, Inc. by Chris Meaux with support from McNeese State University. The company is now headquartered in Lafayette, Louisiana.

History 

Waitr, Inc. was founded at McNeese State University as a project lead by Chris Meaux. It quickly spread throughout Louisiana and across the southern United States. In 2015, Waitr hired Griff’s Hamburger Executive Cory Griffin as Chief Operating Officer.

In 2018, the company was acquired through a $308 million reverse takeover by Tilman Fertitta's Lancadia holdings, which is part of the Fertitta Entertainment portfolio. In January 2019, Waitr acquired Minneapolis-based Bite Squad for $321 million which effectively doubled Waitr's size. Bite Squad founder Kian Salehi stayed on for several months post-acquisition before leaving the company.

In 2019, the company announced it would lay-off all of its employed drivers, and move to a contract-only model, similar to Grubhub and DoorDash. The move resulted in 2,300 drivers being laid off.

Carl Grimstad was appointed Waitr's CEO in 2020 and tasked with recovering the company after a  net loss in 2019. Despite the significant increase in footprint it gained from the Bite Squad acquisition, Waitr still only had a 3% share of the US food delivery market. Grimstad focused on differentiating the company from its competitors, especially DoorDash, Uber Eats, and Grubhub.

In 2021, Waitr made several major acquisitions.

The company announced in January 2022 that later in the year it would be rebranding itself ASAP and shift focus to non-restaurant deliveries, particularly cannabis. The company expected to begin cannabis deliveries in Canada by the end of the year. Waiter.com had been founded in 1995 and trademarked its name in 2000, 8 years before Waitr's founding.

References

External links 
 

Online food retailers of the United States
American companies established in 2008
Online food ordering